Urkan is a rural locality (a selo) and the administrative center of Urkansky Selsoviet of Tyndinsky District, Amur Oblast, Russia. The population was 777 in 2018. There are 19 streets.

Geography 
Urkan is located 147 km south of Tynda (the district's administrative centre) by road. Bugorki is the nearest rural locality.

References 

Rural localities in Tyndinsky District